Madhavi may refer to:
 Goddess Radha, consort of Lord Krishna
Goddess Lakshmi, consort of Lord Vishnu
Madhavi (Silappatikaram), a character in the ancient Tamil epic Cilapathikaram
 Madhavi (actress), South Indian film actress
 Madhavi Krishnan, British chemist
 Madhavi Mudgal, Odissi dancer
 Madhavi Sardesai, Indian academical
 Madhavi (play), a 1982 play by Bhisham Sahni
 Madhavi (TV series), a Tamil soap opera that aired on Sun TV from 2009 to 2011.

See also
Madhava (disambiguation)

Feminine given names